The Okroy Cloud, is an intergalactic dust cloud near the Milky Way. Its intergalactic nature was first studied by Bogdan Wszolek and Solvia Massi in 1988.

See also
 Local Group
 Satellite galaxies of the Milky Way

References

Milky Way
Milky Way Subgroup
Virgo (constellation)
Stellar streams
?
Local Group